De Witt Clinton Flanagan (December 28, 1870, New York City – January 15, 1946, Utica, New York) was an American businessman and Democratic Party politician from New Jersey who briefly represented the 4th congressional district from 1902 to 1903.

Early life and career
Flanagan was born in New York City on December 28, 1870. He attended the Callison and Woodbridge private schools and Columbia College.

He pursued a commercial career, with interests in a number of industrial enterprises.

Congress
He was elected as a Democrat to the Fifty-seventh Congress to fill the vacancy caused by the death of Joshua S. Salmon, and served in office from June 18, 1902, to March 3, 1903.

Later career and death
After leaving Congress, he was a delegate to the 1904 Democratic National Convention.

Together with August Belmont, he was one of the organizers of the Boston, Cape Cod & New York Canal Co., which built and operated the Cape Cod Canal. He engaged in the agricultural and civic development of Baldwin County, Alabama.

He died in Utica, New York on January 15, 1946, and was interred in the family mausoleum in Woodlawn Cemetery, Bronx, New York.

References

Notes

External links 

De Witt Clinton Flanagan at The Political Graveyard

1870 births
1946 deaths
Columbia College (New York) alumni
Democratic Party members of the New Jersey General Assembly
Politicians from Trenton, New Jersey
Burials at Woodlawn Cemetery (Bronx, New York)
Democratic Party members of the United States House of Representatives from New Jersey